Widget may refer to:

 Widget (beer), a device placed in cans and bottles of beer to aid in the generation of froth
 Widget (economics), a placeholder name for an unnamed, unspecified, or hypothetical manufactured good or product
 Software widget, a generic type of software application comprising portable code intended for one or more different software platforms
Widget (GUI), an element of interaction in a graphical user interface, such as a button or a scroll bar
 Widget toolkit, a software library containing a collection of GUI widgets that collaborate when used in the construction of applications
 Web widget, an applet intended to be used within web pages
 E-9A Widget, a turboprop airliner
 Widget (Marvel Comics), a comic book character, an alternate version of Shadowcat from the Days of Future Past timeline
 Widget (TV series) or Widget the World Watcher, a 1990s animated television series
Widget (video game), based on the TV series
 Widget, a character on the Wow! Wow! Wubbzy! cartoon
 Widget, a character on the Cyberchase cartoon
 Widget drive, a hard drive used only in the Apple Lisa computer system
 The Widget, nickname of New York World Journal Tribune

See also
 Widget Workshop, a science-based computer game developed by Maxis
 The MediaWiki Widgets extension